Kunimoto is a Japanese surname. Notable people with the surname include:

 Keisuke Kunimoto (Lee Gyeong-Woo; born 1989), Japanese/Zainichi Korean race car driver
 Kiichi Kunimoto (born 1981), Japanese mixed martial artist
 Takahiro Kunimoto (born 1997), Japanese football player
 Takeaki Kunimoto (born 1962), Japanese video game composer
 Takeharu Kunimoto (1960–2015), Japanese shamisen player and rōkyoku singer
 Yuji Kunimoto (born 1990), Japanese racing driver

Fictional Characters
 Akima Kunimoto, A character from the 2000 animated film Titan A.E.

See also
 6908 Kunimoto, a main-belt asteroid

Japanese-language surnames